Jean De Mesmaeker (21 December 1935 – 30 April 2017) known by the pseudonym Jidéhem ("JDM"), was a Belgian comics artist in the Marcinelle school tradition. He was best known for his series featuring a cute, playful and adventurous young girl, Sophie. A creator of his own series Sophie, and Ginger, and noted for his work with Starter and Uhu-man, he is known for his collaborations and assistance to the work of André Franquin during a long career at the Franco-Belgian comics magazine Spirou, working on Spirou et Fantasio and Gaston Lagaffe, on which he shared co-authorship for several years.

Sources

 Jidéhem publications in Spirou BDoubliées 

Footnotes

External links
Jidéhem biography on Lambiek Comiclopedia
Jidéhem profile on Dupuis
Jidéhem Biography on bédétheque  
Fiat 850 in Starter in le Journal de Spirou 

1935 births
2017 deaths
Belgian comics artists
Belgian humorists